The manga Captain Tsubasa World Youth is a direct sequel to Yōichi Takahashi Captain Tsubasa series. The series follows Aoi Shingo, a Japanese teenager who goes to Italy, hoping to play for a major Italian professional football soccer team. He does it so that he will improve his skills to join the young Japan's national football team and play alongside his idol Tsubasa Oozora to participate in the AFC Youth Championship.

The manga was published by Shueisha in the Weekly Shōnen Jump and collected in eighteen tankōbon volumes between December 1994 and November 1997. Studio Comet adapted the series into an anime series that also retells the events from Tsubasa's childhood under the title of Captain Tsubasa J.

Volume list

References

World Youth